Johnny Reid (September 13, 1896 in Glasgow, Scotland – February 28, 1980) was a Scottish soccer inside right who spent most of his career in the American Soccer League.

Although born in Scotland, Reid began his career with the Montreal Blue Bonnets in Canada before moving to the Fall River Marksmen of the American Soccer League. He spent nearly four seasons in Fall River, winning three league title and one National Challenge Cup title. In the 1924 National Challenge Cup, Reid scored one of the Marksmen's four goals in their 4-2 victory over St. Louis Vesper Buick. In the fall of 1926, his career became erratic. He began the season with the Marksmen, but transferred to Philadelphia Field Club after only three games. Nineteen games later, he was with the Brooklyn Wanderers where he finished the season. He then began the 1927-1928 season with J&P Coats, but moved back to the Marksmen after only nine games. He then played four games in Fall River and left the ASL.

References

1896 births
1980 deaths
Scottish footballers
American Soccer League (1921–1933) players
Fall River Marksmen players
Philadelphia Field Club players
Brooklyn Wanderers players
J&P Coats players
Association football forwards
Scottish expatriate sportspeople in the United States
Expatriate soccer players in the United States
Scottish expatriate footballers